Bubba Wyche (born April 4, 1946) is a former American and Canadian football quarterback in the Canadian Football League (CFL) and World Football League (WFL). He played in the CFL for the Saskatchewan Roughriders and the WFL for the Chicago Fire, Detroit Wheels, and Shreveport Steamers. Wyche played college football at Tennessee.

His brother, Sam Wyche, played and coached in the National Football League (NFL). Former Major League Baseball player Bubba Trammell, a Tennessee native, was named after him.

References

1946 births
Living people
American football quarterbacks
Canadian football quarterbacks
Tennessee Volunteers football players
Saskatchewan Roughriders players
Chicago Fire (WFL) players
Detroit Wheels players
Shreveport Steamer players